The Fazaia Ruth Pfau Medical College (FRPMC) is a medical College funded by the Pakistan Air Force which is located in PAF Base Faisal, Shahrah-e-Faisal, Karachi, Sindh, Pakistan. It is a constituent college of Air University, Islamabad of Pakistan Air Force.

Fazaia Ruth Pfau Medical College, Karachi was established in February, 2019 as a constituent institution of Air University, Islamabad. Air University, Islamabad is a public University, chartered in 2002 under governance of Pakistan Air Force. Faculty of Medicine at Air University offers a medical program with modular curriculum using a spiral approach. A panel of medical education experts has designed this curriculum in alignment with Pakistan Medical Commission guidelines. Its parent university, Air University (Pakistan Air Force) is an accredited university by the Higher Education Commission of Pakistan.

Fazaia Ruth Pfau Medical College, Karachi has been established with an aim to train and educate the future physicians using a holistic, community oriented rather than the disease-oriented approach. Importance of evidence and research in clinical decision-making will be the hall mark of educational strategy. Community health experts have been engaged to review the curriculum and prioritized the community health issues in teaching program. The students will be trained to use logic, knowledge and social empathy as primary tools for patient care.

Establishment of Fazaia Ruth Pfau Medical College aims to serve a greater benefit in the patient care to the community at large. Induction of Clinical Professorial faculty, introduction of medical and surgical subspecialties, commissioning of sophisticated medical equipment, elevation of emergency and diagnostic services and patient record management in accordance with the standards and guidelines of PMC, adding to advancement in patient management.

A proactive approach towards promoting interdisciplinary health sciences research among faculty, interns and students will remains its defining characteristic. The community-oriented medical education approach will expose students to community and primary health care from the very beginning. 
The college has a well designed infrastructure and has well developed and furnished laboratories keeping in view the needs of modern education system. The college has a special emphasis on clinical skills which are taught to the students from day first.

Faculty 
The college has 3 main faculties:

 Faculty of Basic Science
 Faculty of Clinical Science
 Faculty of Medical Education

References

2019 establishments in Pakistan
Medical colleges in Sindh
Universities and colleges in Karachi
Pakistan Air Force